The Nuqtavi ( Nuqṭawiyyah) movement was founded by Mahmūd Pasīkhānī when he proclaimed himself the Mahdi in 1397. The group is an offshoot of the Ḥurūfī movement, from which Pasīkhānī was expelled for arrogance. The group first arose in Anjudan near Kashan an area known for its Nizārī Ismā'īlī Shia Islam. The group attempted to proclaim Shah Tahmasp as Mahdi after Pasīkhānī died.

Doctrines 
Pasīkhānī never married and encouraged celibacy among his followers saying that the celibate have reached the rank of wāḥid, which has the numerical value of nineteen. The Nuqtavis placed an exceptionally heavy emphasis on the number nineteen. They also advanced a cyclical view of time, which is reminiscent of the Ismā'īlī. The Nuqtavis held that the total length of the Earth's existence is 64,000 years and that this is divided into four periods of 16,000 years and these in turn are subdivided into two sections of 8,000 years, one an Arab epoch and the other a Persian epoch.

Intellectual influences 

The Nuqtavis owe most of their doctrines to the ḥurūfis. Most obviously the personal link between Pasīkhānī and  Fażlallah Astarabādī (d.1394), founder of the Ḥurūfī movement. The notable influences were the obsession with the numerical and phonemic meanings of the letters of the Persian-Arabic alphabet. Likewise Astarabādī had proclaimed himself Mahdi as well as Jesus returned. Like many of the Muslim splinter groups in Iran, the Ḥurūfiyyah believed that Fażlallah Astarabādī's Javedanname abrogated previous revelation (i.e. the Qur'an).

Modern influences 

The writings of Ali Mohammad Shirazi, known as the Báb, contained many codified chronograms, cabbalistic interpretations, talismanic figures, astrological tables, and numerical calculations, some of which appear to be similar to Nuqtavi symbolism. ʿAlī Muḥammad Nāżim al-Sharī‘ah claims that the Báb was taught the Nuqtavi doctrines while imprisoned in Maku and that he incorporated them directly into his Bayán. Saiedi states, however, that while some elements found in the Nuqtavi school are confirmed in the writings of the Báb (Nuqtaye Ula), the literal emphasis that the Nuqtavi school placed on letters as direct elements of divine creation are foreign to the Báb's teachings; his teachings have little to do with the issue of the actual letters or their literal divine character, but instead, concern a mystical world view where the sacred character of human beings is the image of God.

See also 
Mahdi
Isma'ili
Sufism
Nāīmee
Nasīmee
Hurufiyya
Shi'a Islam
Murād Mīrzā
Nuqta-yi Ula (Báb)
Mahmoud Pasikhani
List of extinct Shia sects

Notes

External links 
HORUFISM
ASTARĀBĀDĪ, FAŻLALLĀH (d. 796/1394), founder of the Ḥorūfī religion.
ʿALĪ AL-AʿLĀ (d. 822/1419), also known as Amīr Sayyed ʿAlī, principal successor of Fażlallāh Astarābādī, founder of the Ḥorūfī sect.

References 
Hamid Algar: Nuqtavi, Encyclopedia of Islam, 1994, p. 114-117
Marshall G. Hodgson: The Venture of Islam, Vols. I and II

Islam in Iran
Shia Islamic branches
Shia Sufi orders